Quentin Depehi (born 26 November 1997) is a French professional footballer who plays as a forward.

Club career
Born in Paris, Depehi lived in Réunion, before moving back to France to join the Toulouse academy in 2014. He made his professional debut for Toulouse in a 2–1 Ligue 1 loss with Metz on 19 November 2016.

References

External links
 
 
 Maxifoot Profile
 Sofoot Profile
 

Living people
1997 births
Footballers from Paris
Association football forwards
French footballers
Footballers from Réunion
French people of Réunionnais descent
Toulouse FC players
En Avant Guingamp players
Évreux FC 27 players
Championnat National 3 players
Ligue 1 players